The Rally of Social-Democrat Independents (RSI) was a political party in Burkina Faso led by Alain Bédouma Yoda.

History
The party was officially recognised on 6 January 1992, and won a single seat in the May 1992 parliamentary elections. In 1996 it merged into the new Congress for Democracy and Progress.

References

1996 disestablishments in Burkina Faso
Defunct political parties in Burkina Faso
Political parties disestablished in 1996
Political parties with year of establishment missing
Social democratic parties in Burkina Faso